is a Prefectural Natural Park in central Miyazaki Prefecture, Japan. Established in 1958, the park is within the municipality of Saito.

See also
 National Parks of Japan

References

External links
  Map of Saitobaru-Sugiyasukyō Prefectural Natural Park

Parks and gardens in Miyazaki Prefecture
Protected areas established in 1958
1958 establishments in Japan